Fine Artist is a raster graphics editor program created by Microsoft Kids in 1993. Using this program, it is possible to create paintings. The interface and environment is especially targeted towards children and is set in Imaginopolis with the main helper being a character known as McZee. Fine Artist was announced by Microsoft on 7 December 1993  and was released in 1994. It ran on both MS-DOS 3.2 and the Windows 3.1 operating system. A version for Apple Macintosh was also released. Fine Artist is discontinued, but can still be acquired from online stores and auction websites such as eBay.

The program took place in the fictional place of Imaginopolis and had several levels of a building each with a different topic (e.g. one for creating new images, one as a gallery of existing images). The design of the program was very similar to that of its sister program Creative Writer. The program runs full screen and creates an all-inclusive environment.

Fine Artist was considerably more powerful than Microsoft Paint, as it included clipart that could easily be manipulated and have . Fine Artist also used sounds heavily where each tool would make a different noise.

See also
Microsoft Home
Creative Writer
3D Movie Maker

References

1993 software
1993 video games
Windows games
Discontinued Microsoft software
Classic Mac OS software
Drawing video games
Video games developed in the United States